John Simonds may refer to:
 John O. Simonds, American landscape architect, planner, educator, and environmentalist
 John Simonds (trade unionist), British trade union leader

See also
 John Symonds (disambiguation)
 John Simmonds (disambiguation)